The 2014 Torneo Descentralizado de Fútbol Profesional (known as the 2014 Copa Movistar for sponsorship reasons) was the 98th season of the highest division of Peruvian football. A total of 16 teams competed in the tournament. The Torneo Descentralizado began on June 7 and ended on December 21 2014.

Tournament modus
The season was divided into three stages. The first two stages were two smaller Apertura and Clausura tournaments of 15 games each. Each team played other teams once during the Apertura tournament and during the Clausura tournament in a reversed order for a total of 30 matches each. In the third stage the championship was contested in a two-legged Play-off. The two teams ranked first at the end of the Apertura and Clausura tournaments moved on to the next round as long as they finished within the top eight teams in the aggregate table. The Play-off finalists qualified for the Copa Libertadores second stage. The remaining international competition berths were determined by the season aggregate table. Bonus points were awarded to two teams based on the performance of their reserve teams in the 2014 Torneo de Promoción y Reserva at the end of the tournament. The two teams with the fewest points in the aggregate table at the end of the tournament was relegated.

Teams
A total of 16 teams competed in the championship, including 14 sides from the 2013 season, the 2013 Peruvian Segunda División champion, and the 2013 Copa Perú champion.

Pacífico and José Gálvez were relegated to 2014 Peruvian Segunda División the previous season: Pacífico immediately returned to the Peruvian Segunda Division after being promoted the previous year. José Gálvez was relegated for the sixth time after a brief two-year tenure in the top division thus becoming the Peruvian team with the most promotions and relegations in history.

The relegated teams were replaced by Los Caimanes and San Simón from the Peruvian Segunda División and Copa Perú respectively who both make their debut in the top flight of Peruvian football. Los Caimanes won the Segunda División by a three-point margin after a short two-year tenure in it. San Simón reached the top division by defeating Unión Huaral in the Copa Perú final.

Stadia locations

Torneo Apertura

Standings

Results

Torneo Clausura

Standings

Clausura play-off
Because Alianza Lima and Sporting Cristal tied with 33 points a title play-off on neutral ground was played as the tournament rules specify.

Results

Play-offs
The Third Stage were the finals (also known as the Play-off) of the 2014 season between the winners of the Clausura and Apertura tournaments. The team with the most points on the aggregate table chose which leg they play as the home team.

Aggregate table
The aggregate table determined the four teams who qualified to the 2015 Copa Sudamericana, one team to the 2015 Copa Libertadores if necessary, and the two teams to be relegated to the Segunda División. The aggregate table consisted of the points earned in the Apertura and Clausura stages.

Relegation play-off
Because Sport Huancayo and Los Caimanes tied with 32 points a relegation play-off on neutral ground will be played as the tournament rules specify.

See also
2014 Torneo del Inca
2014 Torneo de Promoción y Reserva

References

External links 

  
Tournament regulations 
Torneo Descentralizado news at Peru.com 
Torneo Descentralizado statistics and news at Dechalaca.com 

2014
1